The Canon EOS 20D is an 8.2-megapixel semi-professional digital single-lens reflex camera, initially announced on 19 August 2004 at a recommended retail price of US$1,499. It is the successor of the EOS 10D, and was succeeded by the EOS 30D in August 2006. It accepts EF and EF-S lenses and uses an APS-C sized image sensor.

Improvements
The 20D features a new sensor and a greater megapixel count (8.2 megapixels instead of 6.3) and retains the Canon 1.6x crop factor.  The 20D supports USB 2.0. The 20D has a larger buffer and can shoot more frames per second. It also uses the E-TTL II flash metering system and uses the DIGIC II image processor.

The EOS 20D (with appropriate firmware updates) can also accept the Canon Wireless File Transmitter WFT-E1/E1A for fast file transfer to a remote file server, either through an ethernet cable or a Wi-Fi network.

Resolution
The Canon EOS 20D has several resolution settings:
 Large/Fine (3504 x 2336 JPEG Fine)
 Large/Normal (3504 x 2336 JPEG Normal)
 Medium/Fine (2544 x 1696 JPEG Fine)
 Medium/Normal (2544 x 1696 JPEG Normal)
 Small/Fine – 1728 x 1152 JPEG Fine
 Small/Normal (1728 x 1152 JPEG Normal)
 RAW + Large/Fine (3504 RAW + 3504 JPEG Fine)
 RAW + Large/Normal (3504 RAW + 3504 JPEG Normal)
 RAW + Medium/Fine (3504 RAW + 2544 JPEG Fine)
 RAW + Medium / Normal (3504 RAW + 2544 JPEG Normal)
 RAW + Small/Fine (3504 RAW + 1152 JPEG Fine)
 RAW + Small/Normal – (3504 RAW + 1152 JPEG Normal)
 RAW (3504 x 2336 RAW)

Features
The 20D is the first Canon prosumer camera to use the EF-S lens mount; the first Canon EOS camera to use the mount was the 300D (the Digital Rebel in North America).

Creative Zone
 A-DEP: The camera automatically selects the aperture and shutter speed to keep most of the image in focus. (Only recommended in high light conditions as the camera tends to choose smaller f/stops)
 M (Manual): The camera lets you choose manually the aperture and shutter speed.
 Av (Aperture priority): The camera lets the user choose the aperture (f/) value and then automatically adjusts the shutter speed for correct exposure.
 Tv (Shutter speed priority): The camera lets the user set the shutter speed and automatically sets the aperture for correct exposure.
 P (Program AE): The camera automatically chooses an aperture and shutter combination for correct exposure and the user can change between one of these combinations.

Basic Zone
 Auto (represented with a green rectangle): Completely automatic shooting.
 Portrait: The camera attempts to create a more shallow depth of field to create more striking portraits.
 Landscape: For shooting landscapes and sunsets.
 Close-Up: For shooting small objects near to the camera.
 Sports: For capturing fast moving objects.
 Night Scene: Shoots with flash and with slow shutter so that the subject is illuminated by the flash and the background (e.g. a city) is also captured naturally in the night.
 No Flash: All automatic with no flash.

EOS 20Da
Canon released the EOS 20Da on 14 February 2005 in Japan.  It is a variant of the 20D designed for astrophotography.  On 1 June 2005 Canon announced that the 20Da would be made available worldwide.

The main differences between the 20Da and 20D are the replacement of the "hot mirror" infra-red (IR) filter which covers the CMOS sensor on the 20D and live view mode.

In conventional photography, the IR filter is used to make the spectral response of the CMOS sensor more like that of the human eye.  In this way, the pictures gathered by the sensor more closely resemble the world as we see it. In astro-photography, many objects of interest emit strongly in the red H-α line, which is heavily attenuated by the IR filter on the 20D.  The IR filter of the 20Da passes 2.5 times more light at around this 656 nm wavelength as the filter of the 20D, allowing more fine detail to be revealed in long exposures of emission nebulae. As a side effect, the color balance is slightly altered in normal daylight photography.

It is extremely difficult to focus an extremely dim image with a reflex viewfinder; locking the mirror up and opening the shutter (live view) was introduced in the 20Da to address this issue. When used the camera provides a live image of the center of the field of view to allow focusing on a bright star.  Live view for this application requires a lens which supports fully mechanical focus in manual mode, and is not suitable for normal daytime use.

Reviews report that image noise in the 20Da is lower than in the 20D, and equivalent to that of the 5D MkII.

The EOS 20Da was discontinued when the 30D was introduced in 2006. Canon produced no similar model for astrophotography for years, resulting in many astrophotographers making similar aftermarket modifications to later Canon models.

In April 2012, Canon announced the EOS 60Da which is the successor to the EOS 20Da.

Firmware
The latest firmware available for the 20D (and believed to be the final update) is version 2.0.3, made available 23 August 2005, which improves the communication reliability with some CF cards and other minor changes.

References

External links

Canon EOS 20D Specifications

20D
Cameras introduced in 2004